Government Arts College may refer to one of the following higher education institutes in India:

 Government Arts College, Ambedkar Veedhi, in Ambedkar Veedhi, K.R. Circle, Bangalore, Karnatka
 Government Arts College, Chidambaram, in C-Mutlur, Chidambaram, Cuddalore district, Tamil Nadu
 Government Arts College, Coimbatore, in Tamil Nadu
 Government Arts College, Dharmapuri, in Dharmapuri, Tamil Nadu
 Government Arts College, Karur, in Karur, Tamil Nadu
 Government Arts College, Kumbakonam, in Tamil Nadu
 Government Arts College, Ooty, in Tamil Nadu
 Government Arts College, Rajahmundry, in Andhra Pradesh
 Government Arts College, Salem, in Salem, Tamil Nadu
 Government Arts College, Thiruvananthapuram, in Trivandrum, Kerala
 Government Arts College, Thiruvannamalai, in Thiruvannamalai, Tamil Nadu
 Government Arts College, Udumalpet, in Udumalpet, Tamil Nadu